Rail service fares in Greater London and the surrounding area are calculated in accordance with the London fare zones system managed by Transport for London. Within London, all London Underground, National Rail, London Overground, TfL Rail and Docklands Light Railway stations are assigned to six fare zones. Fare zone 1 covers the central area and fare zones 2, 3, 4, 5 and 6 form concentric rings around it. Some National Rail stations and almost all Transport for London served stations outside Greater London in the home counties of Buckinghamshire, Essex, Hertfordshire and Surrey are either included in fare zones 4, 5 or 6 or in extended zones beyond these. Transport for London fare zones are also known simply as zones or travelcard zones, referring to their use in calculating prices for the travelcards or pay-as-you-go caps. Before flat fares were introduced in 2004, fare zones were used on the London Buses network. London fare zones are also used for calculating the cost of single and return paper tickets, Oyster card pay-as-you-go fares and season tickets.

History
Before the introduction of fare zones, tickets for rail travel in Greater London were purchased on a 'point-to-point' basis between two stations, either as a single, return or season ticket; and were priced according to distance travelled. During the early 1980s the London Transport Executive of the Greater London Council made a series of revisions to fares which introduced the fare zones. The purpose of creating zones was to simplify fares, in order to speed up the process of buying tickets. On buses this became necessary as conductors were being eliminated in favour of the driver selling tickets, which was having an impact on the time it took passengers to board the bus and therefore on journey times.

The first zones were introduced on 4 October 1981. The whole of Greater London was divided into bus zones where flat fares applied. On the London Underground the area that is now zone 1 was divided into two overlapping areas called City and West End. On 21 March 1982 fares to all other London Underground stations were graduated at three mile intervals, effectively creating zones, although they were not named as such until 1983 when the Travelcard product was launched covering five numbered zones. City and West End became zone 1 and the rest of Greater London was within zones 2, 3, 4 and 5. Further products were launched using the zones: One Day Travelcard (1984), Capitalcard (1985), One Day Capitalcard (1986). In January 1991 Zone 5 was split to create a new Zone 6.

Principal fare zones
All of Greater London is within the six principal fare zones numbered 1 to 6. Inner zone 1 forms a roughly circular area and covers central London. Each of five outer zones forms a concentric ring around it. Zones 4, 5 and 6 additionally extend into parts of Essex, Hertfordshire and Surrey. List of boroughs in each zone:

Ancillary zones

For some services outside Greater London, where fares are set by Transport for London, there are three additional zones 7, 8 and 9. They extend into Buckinghamshire, Essex and Hertfordshire to include all stations served by TfL services (except Shenfield, Watford Junction) and some c2c services that are outside Greater London. Unlike zones 2–6, they do not form complete rings around London.

As of January 2013, there were eight National Rail stations outside the nine numbered fare zones, where Oyster card pay as you go is permitted and fares are set by the train operating companies. They are located in Essex and Hertfordshire, and are organised into additional areas B, C, G and W. On maps, these stations are shown as being outside fare zones 1–9, but within the 'special fares' Oyster pay as you go area.

In January 2016, the Oyster and contactless system was extended to Gatwick Airport in Crawley, West Sussex, and the stations down that line (Horley, Salfords, Earlswood, Redhill and Merstham).

Notes

References

Transport infrastructure in London
Fare collection systems in London
Fare zones